Euriphene butleri is a butterfly in the family Nymphalidae. It is found in the Democratic Republic of the Congo and Uganda.

Subspecies
Euriphene butleri butleri (Democratic Republic of the Congo: Ituri and Kivu, Uganda: Toro district)
Euriphene butleri kivuensis (Jackson & Howarth, 1957) (Democratic Republic of the Congo: Kwidgwi Island in Lake Kivu)
Euriphene butleri remota Hecq, 1994 (Democratic Republic of the Congo)

References

Butterflies described in 1904
Euriphene